Athens Line, LLC  is a Class III shortline railroad operating in Georgia, United States. Established in 2001, the ABR leases  of former Norfolk Southern Railway track between Madison and Nicholson, Georgia, via Athens. It is operated under contract by the Hartwell Railroad.

See also

 Great Walton Railroad
 Central of Georgia
 Southern Railway

References

External links
 Official website, Great Walton Railroad.com
 Athens Line, Georgia Rails (http://www.atlantarails.com/)
 Hartwell Railroad Profile, Railfanning.org

Georgia (U.S. state) railroads
Spin-offs of the Norfolk Southern Railway
Non-operating common carrier freight railroads in the United States
Railway companies established in 2001